Rowan Lee Mills (born 10 July 1970) is an English former footballer who played as a striker.

In a career spanning fourteen years he made 293 appearances in the Football League, scoring 86 goals. He played for numerous clubs and was transferred for some big money moves; totalling around £2 million. Arguably his most successful period came at Port Vale and Bradford City in the late 1990s. He helped Vale to their highest post-war finish in the league, whilst he helped Bradford win promotion into the Premier League.

Playing career
Born in Mexborough, Mills started his career with Stocksbridge Park Steels before being brought to the Football League with Wolverhampton Wanderers, and Derby County.

In July 1995, he joined John Rudge's Port Vale as Derby paid £475,000 plus Mills in exchange for Robin van der Laan. He made his debut for the "Valiants" as a substitute on 13 August 1995, in a goalless draw with Derby at The Baseball Ground. At the end of the season Derby were promoted, but Vale finished in twelfth spot. On 13 October 1996, he came off the bench at the Victoria Ground to score a last minute equaliser in a Potteries derby game with Stoke City. He finished the  1996–97 season with fifteen goals and was handed the club's player of the year award as the club posted their highest post-war finish – eighth place in the First Division. During the 1997–98 season Mills was the club's top scorer with 16 goals, as Vale narrowly avoiding relegation.

Mills became Bradford City's first £1 million player when Paul Jewell purchased him in preparation for the 1998–99 season. Mills made a large contribution to Bradford's promotion to the Premier League, becoming the club's top scorer with 24 goals. He also scored on his return to Vale Park, perhaps with a point to prove after a Vale programme article described him as "poor" and his touch as "frequently awful". The 1999–2000 season was a poor one for Mills, scoring just six goals as he was troubled with injury and had a falling out with manager Paul Jewell. He spent March 2000 on loan with First Division Manchester City. His poor form left him labelled as a "forgotten man" when he scored twice in the 2000 UEFA Intertoto Cup against Lithuanian side FK Atlantas. New manager Chris Hutchings put Mills on a list of seven "underachievers", with a warning that a continuation of poor form would see those players released. Hutchings' reign lasted only a further four months. However, in that time Hutchings had sold Mills to Portsmouth for a club-record £1.25 million, to make way for Ashley Ward. Pompey later struggled to pay the fee and were put on a transfer embargo by the FA.

He scored five goals in 27 games during the 2000–01 season. He played just two games the following season before a one-month loan to Coventry City in December 2001 soon turned into a £250,000 move at the end of the year. He aimed to fire the "Sky Blues" to the play-offs, though the season ended with Coventry occupying 11th spot. By some measure of irony he played at Fratton Park in a Portsmouth shirt, Graham Barber having deemed both Coventry strips were too similar to Pompey's home strip forced the side to borrow Portsmouth's orange away strip.

In July 2001 he broke his arm in a "freak" training ground incident, this came after recently recovering from a potentially career threatening knee injury. He came back later in the season with "a bang", Mills saying: "I've come in and done OK and let's hope that continues." He was soon battling with an ankle injury, choosing to take injections to avoid time on the sidelines. In February 2003, following a one-month loan with Tony Pulis' Stoke City, where John Rudge was now Director of Football, he signed for the "Potters" on a permanent basis. The next month he was involved in a traffic collision on the M6 motorway and escaped with only minor injuries.

In July 2003 he signed with Telford United. Manager Mick Jones was clearly delighted with the capture, stating: "I don't want to put too much pressure on Lee but I am hopeful he might have the same kind of impact as Alan Shearer had when he moved from Blackburn to Newcastle". After eleven goals in thirty games, Mills tore his ankle ligaments during a training accident, keeping him out of action for three months.

Following the collapse of Telford United there was a race to Mills' signature, which was eventually won by Hereford United. Graham Turner having signed Mills, Mark Robinson and Jonathan Gould, looked to improve upon 2003–04's second-place finish, which saw the "Bulls" agonizingly close to automatic promotion to the Football League. Nine league goals from Mills in the 2004–05 season could not help United catch runaway champions Barnet, for a second consecutive season they crashed out in the play-off semi-finals. Four of his goals had come in the first two months, despite starting just five matches. Mills was released after the semi-final defeat, as was fellow veteran Graham Hyde.

Managerial career
In December 2009, Mills was linked to the management position at Midland Football Alliance club Rocester.

In May 2010 he was confirmed as new manager of Midland Football Alliance club Bridgnorth Town. However at the end of the 2010–11 season, Mills and his assistant Tony Dinning resigned from their posts at Bridgnorth Town, citing a wish to move on to a new challenge. After missing out on the vacant management position at Stafford Rangers, Mills was instead appointed as assistant manager at Bridgnorth's league rivals Ellesmere Rangers. He quit the club in January 2012, due to other commitments. He coached at Dudley College and was appointed as Academy team manager at Stourbridge in May 2018.

Career statistics

Honours
Individual
Port Vale F.C. Player of the Year: 1997

Bradford City
Football League First Division second-place promotion: 1998–99

References

External links
 

1970 births
Living people
People from Mexborough
Footballers from Doncaster
English footballers
Association football forwards
Port Vale F.C. players
Bradford City A.F.C. players
Coventry City F.C. players
Derby County F.C. players
Hereford United F.C. players
Manchester City F.C. players
Portsmouth F.C. players
Stoke City F.C. players
Telford United F.C. players
Wolverhampton Wanderers F.C. players
Stocksbridge Park Steels F.C. players
Premier League players
English Football League players
National League (English football) players
English football managers
Bridgnorth Town F.C. managers